Posadas may refer to:

Places
 Posadas, Misiones, the capital city of the Province of Misiones, Argentina
 Posadas, Spain, a municipality in Córdoba Province, Spain

People
 Alberto Posadas (born 1967), Spanish composer
 Alejandro Posadas (1870–1902), Argentinian physician and surgeon
 Carlos Posadas (1874–1918), musician
 Carmen Posadas (born 1953), prize-winning Uruguayan-Spanish author of books for children
 Gervasio Antonio de Posadas (1757–1833), member of Argentina's Second triumvirate
 Guillermo Posadas (1886–1937), Mexican composer
 J. Posadas or Homero Rómulo Cristalli Frasnelli (1912–1981), Argentine Trotskyist
 Juan Jesús Posadas Ocampo (1926-1993), Mexican catholic archbishop and cardinal
 Manuel G. Posadas (1841–1897), Afro-Argentine musician, journalist and Argentine soldier
 Manuel Posadas (1860–1916), Afro-Argentine musician
 Marcos Leonel Posadas (born 1938), Mexican politician
 Miguel Posadas (1711–1753), Spanish painter
 Daniel Ruiz Posadas (born 1995), Spanish volleyball player

Other uses
 Grupo Posadas, a Mexican hotel company
 Las Posadas, a Latin American celebration during the nine days preceding Christmas
 Posadas de Puerto Rico Associates v. Tourism Company of Puerto Rico, a landmark United States Supreme Court Case addressing freedom of commercial speech

See also
Posada (disambiguation)